Aarón Escandell Banacloche (born 27 September 1995), simply known as Aarón, is a Spanish footballer who plays for FC Cartagena as a goalkeeper.

Club career

Málaga
Born in Carcaixent, Valencia, Aarón finished his formation with Málaga CF. He made his senior debut for the reserves on 15 September 2013, starting in a 0–0 away draw against Atarfe Industrial CF in the Tercera División.

On 8 December 2013 Aarón first appeared with the main squad, being an unused substitute in a 3–3 Copa del Rey home draw against CA Osasuna. For the 2015–16 campaign, he was chosen as third choice behind Guillermo Ochoa and Carlos Kameni.

Granada
On 10 July 2017, Aarón moved to another reserve team, Granada CF B of the Segunda División B. The following 6 June, he signed a new two-year deal with the club and was definitely promoted to the main squad in the Segunda División.

Aarón made his professional debut on 13 September 2018, starting in a 1–2 loss at Elche CF, in the season's Copa del Rey. His first league game occurred the following 9 June, playing the full 90 minutes in a 2–1 home win against AD Alcorcón, as his side was already promoted.

A backup to Rui Silva, Aarón made his La Liga debut on 8 February 2020, starting in a 0–1 loss at Atlético Madrid. On 10 December, he made his European bow in a UEFA Europa League group stage game away to PAOK FC, a goalless draw.

Silva left Granada in the summer of 2021 and Aarón became the new starting goalkeeper for the first matches of the season under incoming manager Robert Moreno, despite the arrival of another Portuguese, Luís Maximiano. Maximiano, however, got the starting spot in September, being regularly used afterwards as the campaign ended in relegation.

Cartagena
On 2 July 2022, Aarón signed a two-year contract with second division side FC Cartagena.

Career statistics

Club

References

External links

1995 births
Living people
People from Ribera Alta (comarca)
Sportspeople from the Province of Valencia
Spanish footballers
Footballers from the Valencian Community
Association football goalkeepers
La Liga players
Segunda División players
Segunda División B players
Tercera División players
Atlético Malagueño players
Club Recreativo Granada players
Granada CF footballers
FC Cartagena footballers